The Infinity Purple is an American powered parachute that was designed and produced by Infinity Power Chutes of Bronson, Michigan. Now out of production, when it was available the aircraft was supplied as a complete ready-to-fly-aircraft.

The Purple was in production in the early 2000s and, while now discontinued, it led to the later Infinity Commander light-sport aircraft model.

Design and development
It also qualified as a US FAR 103 Ultralight Vehicles trainer. It features an APCO Aviation parachute-style wing, two-seats-in-tandem accommodation, tricycle landing gear and a single  Rotax 582 engine in pusher configuration.

The aircraft carriage is built from welded 4130 steel tubing. In flight steering is accomplished via foot pedals that actuate the canopy brakes, creating roll and yaw. The throttle is a handle-type. On the ground the aircraft has lever-controlled nosewheel steering. The main landing gear incorporates spring rod suspension and off-road tires.

Specifications (Purple)

References

Purple
2000s United States sport aircraft
2000s United States ultralight aircraft
Single-engined pusher aircraft
Powered parachutes